The Faculty of Law, University of Delhi is the law department of the University of Delhi. It has the unique distinction of producing the largest number of sitting judges of the Supreme Court of India.

It is situated in the north campus of the University of Delhi and has more than 130 teachers and about 7000 students at present including LL.B., LL.M., and Ph.D. students.

The Faculty of Law operates through three centres within its campus, namely, Campus Law Centre, Law Centre-I and Law Centre-II.

History

Early Years

The Faculty of Law was established in 1924. The then Vice-Chancellor of the University of Delhi, and himself a great lawyer, jurist, and educationist, Dr. Hari Singh Gour was the first Dean of the Faculty of Law. The Faculty was initially housed in the Prince's Pavilion in the Old Viceregal Lodge Grounds. It was only in 1963 that the faculty moved to its present location at the Chhatra Marg, University of Delhi, Delhi.

The Bachelor of laws (LL.B.) degree course was, initially, started as a two-year part-time course, teaching being conducted in the morning with ten teachers. In 1942, along with the morning, evening classes were also started. In 1944, the one-year Master of laws (LL.M.) degree course was introduced. In 1947, after Independence and partition of the country, the demand for the study of law increased. It was also time to look beyond the entrenched British model and restructure legal education to meet the demands of a now Independent India clamouring for equality in access to power, respect and knowledge. Lawyers played a major role in the struggle for freedom. They now had to be trained to create & use law as an instrument of social change and, as Nehru put it, to wipe a tear from every eye. In 1947, LL.B. was made a full-time course (classes being held both in the morning and evening) and new courses were added. LL.M. was made a whole time two-year course. Two new courses, namely, Certificate of Proficiency (Law) and Bachelor of Civil Laws (B.C.L.) were introduced (later abolished in 1961 and 1966, respectively).

One of the Leading Innovators in Legal Education 

The year 1966 was a turning point in the history of the Faculty of Law and legal education in the country. Dean Professor P.K. Tripathi and his team of dedicated teachers adopted and implemented almost all the recommendations, in the 1964 Report, of the Gajendragadkar Committee on Legal Education (appointed by Vice-Chancellor Dr. C.D. Deshmukh).

The two-year LL.B. course was transitioned into the three-year (six semester) course with an internal examination at the end of each semester.

Delhi University Law School made major innovations in the method of teaching. Professor P.K. Tripathi introduced the discussion method of teaching (the Socratic method of teaching) and moved away from the lecture method where students were merely passive recipients of information. Towards this end, the case method of teaching, with decided cases and other study materials being given to the students in advance, was introduced, which enabled the Delhi Law School to achieve the goal of making students active participants in the learning process, thereby also ensuring an in-depth study of law. Teacher participation in the management of the Law School was ensured through appointment of various committee with elected members.

As the number of students grew, the department established its first Centre as Law Centre – I at Mandir Marg in 1970 and the second as Law Centre – II at Dhaula Kuan in 1971. The LL.B day classes of the Faculty of Law were rechristened and shifted to newly established Campus Law Centre in 1975. Today, all centers of the department  operate from the Faculty of Law campus in North Campus.

Academics

Admission 

Delhi University conducts DU LLB Entrance Exam in order to shortlist aspirants for admission in the LL.B. programme. For admission in the LL.M. programme offered by the varsity, candidates need to appear for DU LLM entrance exam. Each year, the DU LL.B. and LL.M. Entrance Exam is conducted in June.

Candidates need to score the minimum required marks in DU LLB Entrance Exam to be eligible to take part in the first counselling round for the LL.B. programme admissions.

Eligibility 

Aspirants need to meet DU LLB entrance exam eligibility criteria as mentioned by Faculty of Law, Delhi University. Eligible candidates need to have at least completed their graduation from a recognised Indian University/Foreign University/Equivalent institution from any stream with minimum 50% marks. Also, candidates in the final year of their graduation/post-graduation are eligible to apply for DU LLB Entrance Exam. However, such candidates will be offered admission on a provisional basis (which will be subject to their clearing their degree examinations).

Faculty of Law - Centers

Campus Law Center 

The Campus Law Centre (CLC) of the Faculty of Law offers a full-time three-year LL.B. programme.

Law Center-I 
About Law Centre-1
Law Centre-I was established in the year 1970 with 600 seats and held its classes in a
building in Kashmere Gate. Soon it was relocated in a School at Mandir Marg. In 1994,
Law Centre-1 was relocated to the North Campus of Delhi University at Chhatra Marg,
within the premises of Faculty of Law. The year 2015 saw allocation of another five
story building to the centre, namely, Umang Bhawan, by the University of Delhi. Presently the centre
functions from this building as well as another set of buildings located adjacent to the
Umang Bhawan.

Law Center-II 

Law Centre-II is one of the institutions in the country which imparts a three-year LL.B. program. To promote student activities at the Centre, a number of committees have been constituted. These committees include Moot Court and Debate Committee, Seminars, Conferences and Extension Lectures, Journal Committee, Legal Aid Committee, Placement Committee and Alumni Committee. There is the active participation of students in these committees. The teacher members and students volunteers organize several activities on a regular basis throughout the year. The S.K. Puri Memorial Moot Court Competition of Law Centre-II "JUSTIFIED" is an annual activity in which teams from all parts of the country participate. The Seminars and Lectures Committee apart from organizing seminars, conferences, and workshops organizes lectures of legal scholars from all over India and abroad.

Pedagogy

Case Method 

The teaching and learning methods in the Faculty of Law are participatory in nature. Delhi University Law School follows the Case Method as the primary mode of teaching and learning. Introduced in the 1960s by Professor P.K. Tripathi, the Case Method, a distinctive Delhi version of the Langdellian Casebook Method of teaching law in law schools in the United States, entails a questioning mindset among teachers and students. The method is based on the principle that the best way to study the Indian legal system and relevant laws is from precedent, i.e. a principle or rule established in a previous legal case that is either binding on or persuasive for a court or other tribunal when deciding subsequent cases with similar issues or facts.

Each semester, the Faculty of Law selects illustrative and landmark cases as decided by the Supreme Court of India or High Courts to be included in a special text-book called the Case Material for each course. The Case Materials may also contain some important articles and commentaries on the relevant area of law. The Case Materials are supplemented by the "Bare Acts" or statutes and prescribed books in each course.

Typically, the teacher assigns reading of selected cases from the Case Material for the subsequent class. Students are expected to come to the class after reading the prescribed cases. A class in the Faculty of Law commences with a discussion based on the assigned case between students and the teacher, followed by a quick reading of the issue and ratio decidendi of the judgement.

Publications

Delhi Law Review (DLR), ISSN: 097-4936 

Delhi Law review is a peer reviewed and refereed journal published by the Faculty of Law, University of Delhi since the year 1978. DLR provides an intellectual platform to legal fraternity to express their opinions in the form of articles, case comments, book reviews, etc.

Journal of the Campus Law Centre (JCLC), ISSN: 2321-4716 
Journal of the Campus Law Centre is a refereed journal published by Campus Law Centre, University of Delhi, Delhi since the year 2013. It seeks to provide a platform to the legal fraternity for expressing their views, ideas and research undertaken by them. It invites original and previously unpublished articles, notes and comments from academician, judges, lawyers, research scholars on any contemporary legal and socio-legal issue.

National Capital Law Journal, ISSN: 0972-0936 

National Capital Law Journal is published by Law Centre-II, Faculty of Law, University of Delhi, Delhi since the year 1996. It invites articles, papers, case notes, book reviews and essays every year from academicians, independent researchers, practitioners and students.

Journal of Law Teachers of India (JOLT-I), ISSN: 2231-1580 

Journal of Law Teachers of India is the flagship journal of Law Centre-I, Faculty of Law, Delhi. The first volume of JOLT-I was brought out in association with Association of Law Teachers of India (ALT-I) in the year 2010. The main objective of JOLT-I is to encourage good legal writing on all areas of law and research among students and teaching faculty alike. All the papers are reviewed before publication. The journal has an advisory board as well as editorial board comprising eminent Scholars.

Delhi Law Review, Student Edition, ISSN: 0973-00IX 
This is a student driven academic journal covering a diverse range of themes and topics of contemporary significance. The journal comprises articles from students within the Faculty of Law, University of Delhi and outside of it. The articles are selected on the basis of a double-blind peer-review system. Its first online edition was released in 2016-2017.

Library

The Law Faculty Library, University of Delhi was established in July, 1924. It has over one lakh fifty thousand books and a large number of law reports and journals. It subscribes to nearly 140 national and international journals.

Moot Court 
Every year the Faculty of Law organizes and hosts national and international level moot court competitions. Students from law schools  participate  in simulated court proceedings, usually involving drafting memorials or memorandum and participating in oral argument.
 K K Luthra International Moot court by Campus Law Centre. 
 NHRC & LC-1 National Moot Court Competition on Human Rights by Law Centre-I 
 The All Delhi (NCR) Moot Court Competition by Law Centre-I 
 Justified  - National Moot Court Competition by Law Centre-II

Legal Services Programme

The Faculty has a comprehensive programme for clinical legal education with a view to undertake activities such as moot courts, legal aid services, legal awareness and professional skills development for its students.

The Faculty has been running a Legal Services Programme since the early seventies.The main objective of Legal Services Programme are to:(a) impart clinical legal education, (b) provide social service opportunities, and (c) impart socially relevant legal education.

Activities
Students run a Legal Services Clinic at the University premises
Legal awareness programmes 
Legal outreaches in slum-clusters
Prison visits
Lok Adalat (Alternative Dispute Resolution)
Nukkad Natak (Street Plays)
Placement Assistance Council consisting of student bodies.

Infrastructure

Faculty of Law Campus 

The campus is situated in the North Campus of Delhi University. The academic & administrative buildings consist of the classrooms, seminar halls, the libraries, the moot court hall, legal aid hall, pantry, underground parking, lawns and administrative offices of each Law Center. In the year 2016, the Faculty of Law inaugurated Umang Bhawan, a new building, spread over 90,000 sqft, which could accommodate the three Law Centers as per the norms laid down by the Bar Council of India (BCI). The new building is situated next to the Arts Faculty campus. It is at a distance of 400 meters from the old building of Faculty of Law. Currently both buildings are operational.

Hostel Accommodation 

There are twelve hostels for male and female students who are pursuing full-time courses in the University. These are: Gwyer Hall, International Students House, Jubilee hall, Mansarovar Hostel, Post-Graduate Men's Hostel, University Hostel for Women, Meghdoot Hostel, D. S. Kothari, V. K. R. V. Rao Hostel, International Students House for Women, North East Students House and W.U.S. University Hostel.

Hostel facilities are available only to Campus Law Center, Law Center-1, and LL.M. 2-year course students as per rules and procedure prescribed by the University and the hostel authorities.

Sports Facilities 

The Delhi University Sports Complex (Delhi University Stadium) is an indoor and outdoor sports arena spread across 10,000 square metres within the North Campus of Delhi University. The complex includes coaching area for women’s wrestling, netball, athletics and boxing. Commonwealth Games of 2010 were conducted here, including the Rugby Sevens tournament.

Notable alumni

Governors

Former 

 O. P. Verma - Former Governor of Punjab, Former Governor of Haryana, Former Chief Justice of Kerala High Court.

Judges of the Supreme Court of India

Current 

 Dhananjaya Y. Chandrachud, Chief Justice of India
 Shripathi Ravindra Bhat
 Hrishikesh Roy
 Hima Kohli
 B. V. Nagarathna
 Sanjay Kishan Kaul
Sanjiv Khanna

Former 
 Madan Mohan Puncchi - 28th Chief Justice of India
 Ranjan Gogoi - 46th Chief Justice of India
 Vikramajit Sen
 Lokeshwar Singh Panta
 Madan B. Lokur
 Arjan Kumar Sikri
 Rohinton Nariman, also a former Solicitor General of India
 Indu Malhotra
 Navin Sinha

Judges of International Supreme Courts 

 Tshering Wangchuk - Current Chief Justice of Supreme Court of Bhutan
 Rinzin Penjor - Judge of Supreme Court of Bhutan

Judges of High Court

 T. Vaiphei - Former Chief Justice of Tripura High Court
Aruna Suresh - Former judge of Delhi High Court and Orissa High Court
Siddharth Mridul - Judge of Delhi High Court

Law Officers of Government

 Pinky Anand - Additional Solicitor General of India  
 Bishwajit Bhattacharyya - Former Additional Solicitor General of India.
 Gopal Subramaniam Former Solicitor General of India
 Mohan Parasaran- Former Solicitor General of India
 Siddharth Luthra -  Former Additional Solicitor General of India.

Politics 
 Jarbom Gamlin - Former Chief Minister of Arunachal Pradesh
 Rajendra Pal Gautam - former Cabinet Minister, Govt. of Delhi
 Bhupinder Singh Hooda - Former chief minister of Haryana
 Arun Jaitley - Former Finance Minister, Government of India.
 Ajit Jogi - Former Chief Minister of Chhattisgarh.
 Ashwani Kumar - Former Law Minister, Government of India
 Meira Kumar - Former Speaker of Lok Sabha.
 Mayawati - Former Chief Minister of Uttar Pradesh.
 Pinaki Misra - Member of Parliament
 Kiren Rijiju  - Union Law Minister
 Kapil Sibal - Former Cabinet Minister of Human Resource Development, Communications and Information Technology and Ministry of Law. 
 Rao Inderjit Singh - Minister of State (Independent Charge), Statistics and Program Implementation.

Civil Servants 

 Kiran Bedi - Former Director General at the Bureau of Police Research and Development.
 D.B. Singh - Secretary of Rajya Sabha

 T. S. Tirumurti - Is an Indian civil servant who belongs to the Indian Foreign Service cadre. He is currently the Permanent Representative of India to the United Nations. The Permanent Representatives (UN Ambassador) is the head of the Permanent Mission to the United Nations in New York City.

 Baljeet Tjinder - Is an Indian mathematician, computer engineer, and biochemical scientist. Currently employed in Virginia, United States.

References 

Law schools in Delhi
Educational institutions established in 1924
Delhi University
University departments in India
1924 establishments in India